The 2015 Stephen F. Austin Lumberjacks football team represented Stephen F. Austin State University in the 2015 NCAA Division I FCS football season. The Lumberjacks were led by second-year head coach Clint Conque and played their home games at Homer Bryce Stadium. They were members of the Southland Conference.

Previous season
The Lumberjacks finished the season 8–5 overall and 5–3 in conference play.  They lost their first round playoff game against Northern Iowa 10–44.

Schedule
Source:

Game summaries

Northern Arizona

Sources:

@ TCU

Sources:

McNeese State

Sources:

@ Abilene Christian

Sources:

Sam Houston State

Sources:

Nicholls

Sources:

@ Southeastern Louisiana

Sources:

Incarnate Word

Sources:

@ Central Arkansas

Sources:

Houston Baptist

Sources:

@ Northwestern State

Sources:

Ranking movements

References

Stephen F. Austin
Stephen F. Austin Lumberjacks football seasons
Stephen F. Austin Lumberjacks football